Colquere (possibly from Aymara qullqi silver, -ri a suffix, "the one with silver") is a mountain in the Chila mountain range in the Andes of Peru, about  high. It is situated in the Arequipa Region, Caylloma Province, on the border of the districts Ichupampa and Coporaque. Colquere lies south of Mismi and north of Humajala, west of the Cantumayo valley.

References 

Mountains of Peru
Mountains of Arequipa Region